Croatia competed at the 1996 Summer Olympics in Atlanta, United States.

Medalists

Athletics

Men
Track & road events

Field events

Basketball

Men's tournament

Roster

Vladan Alanović
Arijan Komazec
Toni Kukoč
Davor Marcelić
Damir Mulaomerović
Veljko Mršić
Velimir Perasović
Dino Rađa
Slaven Rimac
Josip Vranković
Stojko Vranković
Žan Tabak

Preliminary round
The four best teams from each group advanced to the quarterfinal round.

Quarterfinals

5th–8th place

7th–8th place

Boxing

Men

Canoeing

Slalom

Sprint
Men

Gymnastics

Artistic
Men

Handball

Men's Team Competition

Preliminary round

Group A

Semifinals

Final

Roster

 Gold medal

Patrik Ćavar
Slavko Goluža
Božidar Jović
Nenad Kljaić
Venio Losert
Valter Matošević

Alvaro Načinović
Goran Perkovac
Iztok Puc
Zlatko Saračević
Irfan Smajlagić
Bruno Gudelj

Zoran Mikulić
Vladimir Jelčić
Valner Franković
Vladimir Šuster

Rowing

Men

Sailing

Men

Shooting

Men

Women

Swimming

Men

Women

Table tennis

Men

Women

Tennis

Men

Women

Water polo

Men's Team Competition

Group B

Saturday July 20, 1996

Sunday July 21, 1996

Monday July 22, 1996

Tuesday July 23, 1996

Wednesday July 24, 1996

Quarterfinals
Friday July 26, 1996

Semifinals
Saturday July 27, 1996

Finals
Sunday July 28, 1996 —  Silver medal

Roster

 Maro Balić
 Perica Bukić
 Damir Glavan
 Igor Hinić
 Vjekoslav Kobešćak

 Joško Kreković
 Ognjen Kržić
 Dubravko Šimenc
 Siniša Školneković

 Ratko Štritof
 Renato Vrbičić
 Zdeslav Vrdoljak
 Tino Vegar

Wrestling

Men's Greco-Roman

References

sports-reference
Official Olympic Reports
International Olympic Committee results database

Nations at the 1996 Summer Olympics
Olympics
1996